|}

The York Stakes is a Group 2 flat horse race in Great Britain open to horses aged three years or older. It is run at York over a distance of 1 mile 2 furlongs and 56 yards (2,063 metres), and it is scheduled to take place each year in July.

The event was established in 2006, and the inaugural running was won by Best Alibi. It replaced the Scottish Derby, a discontinued race at Ayr.

The York Stakes serves as a possible trial for the following month's International Stakes, which is contested over the same course and distance. The first horse to win both races was Twice Over in 2011.

Records
Most successful horse:
 no horse has won this race more than once

Leading jockey:
 no jockey has won this race more than once

Leading trainer (2 wins):
 Saeed bin Suroor – Stage Gift (2007), Kirklees (2009)
 Roger Charlton - Time Test (2016), Aspetar (2020)
 Andrew Balding - Tullius (2015), Bangkok (2021)

Winners

See also
 Horse racing in Great Britain
 List of British flat horse races

References
 Racing Post:

 galopp-sieger.de – York Stakes.
 horseracingintfed.com – International Federation of Horseracing Authorities – York Stakes (2018).
 pedigreequery.com – York Stakes – York.

Flat races in Great Britain
York Racecourse
Open middle distance horse races
Recurring sporting events established in 2006
2006 establishments in England